The siege of Louisbourg took place in 1745 when a New England colonial force aided by a British fleet captured Louisbourg, the capital of the French province of Île-Royale (present-day Cape Breton Island) during the War of the Austrian Succession, known as King George's War in the British colonies.

The northern British colonies regarded Louisbourg as a menace, calling it the "American Dunkirk" due to its use as a base for privateers. There was regular, intermittent warfare between the French and the Wabanaki Confederacy on one side and the northern New England colonies on the other (See the Northeast Coast Campaigns of 1688, 1703, 1723, 1724). For the French, the Fortress of Louisbourg also protected the chief entrance to Canada, as well as the nearby French fisheries. The French government had spent 25 years in fortifying it, and the cost of its defenses was reckoned at thirty million livres.
Although the fortress's construction and layout was acknowledged as having superior seaward defences, a series of low rises behind them made it vulnerable to a land attack. The low rises provided attackers places to erect siege batteries. The fort's garrison was poorly paid and supplied, and its inexperienced leaders mistrusted them. The colonial attackers were also lacking in experience, but ultimately succeeded in gaining control of the surrounding defences. The defenders surrendered in the face of an imminent assault.

Louisbourg was an important bargaining chip in the peace negotiations to end the war, since it represented a major British success. Factions within the British government were opposed to returning it to the French as part of any peace agreement, but these were eventually overruled, and Louisbourg was returned, over the objections of the victorious British North Americans, to French control after the 1748 Treaty of Aix-la-Chapelle, in return for French concessions elsewhere.

Context

From 1688 onward there had been a number of military campaigns fought between the French and their allies and the English in the region. Under the Treaty of Utrecht, which ended the War of the Spanish Succession, the French colony of Acadia had been ceded to Great Britain. The tribes of Wabanaki Confederacy had a long history of raiding British settlements along Northern New England in present-day Maine. During the 17th and early-18th century, the Wabanaki fought in several campaigns, including in 1688, 1703, 1723, 1724.  Many of the British military leaders of the siege of Louisbourg came from Northern New England, whose family members were killed in the raids.

In the summer of 1744, New Englanders' concerns of further attacks on the Northern New England increased after a French and Wabanaki force sailed from Louisbourg to the nearby British fishing port of Canso, attacking a small fort on Grassy Island and burned it to the ground, taking prisoner 50 British families. This port was used by the New England fishing fleet; however, the Canso Islands (including Grassy Island) were contested by both Britain and France.

The prisoners taken during the Canso raid were first brought to Louisbourg, where they were given freedom to move around. Some of the military men took careful note of the fortress design, layout, and condition, as well as the size and condition of its garrison and armaments. These men were eventually released to Boston, where their intelligence, along with that provided by merchants who did business at Louisbourg, proved useful in planning the attack.

The French, army and civilian alike, were not in the best of condition at Louisbourg. Supplies were short in 1744, and the fishermen were reluctant to sail without adequate provisions. The military rank and file claimed that they were promised a share of the spoils from the Canso raid, which had instead gone to officers, who sold those same provisions and profited in the endeavour. In December 1744, the troops mutinied over the poor conditions and pay that was months overdue. Even after acting Governor Louis Du Pont Du Chambon managed to quiet the discontent by releasing back pay and supplies, the following winter was extremely tense, as the military leadership maintained a tenuous hold on the situation. Duchambon was even reluctant to send for help, fearing the message would be intercepted and spark further unrest. Word of the unrest did, however, make its way to Boston.

In 1745, the governor of the Province of Massachusetts Bay, William Shirley, secured by a narrow margin the support of the Massachusetts legislature for an attack on the fortress. He and the governor of the Province of New Hampshire, Benning Wentworth, sought the support of other colonies. Connecticut provided 500 troops, New Hampshire 450, Rhode Island a ship, New York ten cannons, and Pennsylvania and New Jersey funds. The force was under the command of William Pepperrell of Kittery (in the portion of the Massachusetts colony that is now the state of Maine), and a fleet of colonial ships was assembled and placed under the command of Captain Edward Tyng. Governor Shirley sent to Commodore Peter Warren, the chief officer of the Royal Navy's West Indies station, a request for naval support in the event of an encounter with French warships, which would significantly outclass any of the colonial ships. Warren at first declined this offer, lacking authorization from London to assist. Only a few days later, he received orders from the Admiralty to proceed to protect the New England fisheries. The expedition set sail from Boston in stages beginning in early March 1745 with 4,200 soldiers and sailors aboard a total of 90 ships.

Battle

Canso and Port Toulouse 

The force stopped at Canso to reprovision. There they were met by Commodore Warren, enlarging the expedition by 16 ships. In late March, the naval forces began to blockade Louisbourg, however ice fields were being swept from the Gulf of St. Lawrence to the seas off Louisbourg that spring, presenting a considerable hazard to wooden-hulled sailing ships. The poor weather and general state of disorganization of the New England naval forces resulted in numerous delays to the expedition, however, they kept busy harassing French fishing and shipping in the waters surrounding Île-Royale.

With the ice fields gone by late April, the siege began in earnest. Pepperell's land forces sailed in transports from Canso. On May 2, he besieged Port Toulouse (present-day St. Peter's, Nova Scotia) as well as destroying several coastal villages in the area between Canso and Louisbourg.

Landing 

On May 11, John Gorham and his rangers led the charge to land troops on the shores close to the fortress. They tried to land their whale boats at Flat Point Cover while covered by the fire power of the Lord Montague, Boston Packet and Massachusetts. Gorham was repelled by 20 French troops that occupied the cove. Gorham quickly regrouped with several other vessels and the operation was re-directed to Kennington Cove. The French troops were unable to re-position themselves in time to stop the landing of British troops. After 1500 British were already on shore, 200 French troops arrived to repel the British, led by Pierre Morpain and De la Boularderie. Morpain retreated while De La Boularderie gave himself up as a prisoner. The British would land 2000 troops by the end of the day.

Destroying the fisheries 
While most of the troops were employed at attacking the Royal Battery, the Island Battery and Fortress Louisbourg, others were scouting around the perimeter of the fortress, destroying small fishing villages. On May 8, the Mi'kmaq defended against an attack on near-by Margaret's Bay and killed seven of Warren's troops. On May 11, the English killed or took prisoner seventeen French and the French wounded three English.

On May 19, Edward Tyng in the vessel  along with the ship Massachusetts destroyed St. Ann's Bay, burning the town and shipping. They killed 20 people and took 25 prisoners. The French killed one British soldier. On May 21, the Prince of Orange was joined by the Defence, and together they destroyed Ingonish, burning a town of 80 houses. They continued on to destroy the towns of Bradore and Bayonne.

On May 23, 20 British troops from Jeremiah Moulton's Regiment attacked a small village. While they were in the village, they were surrounded by 100 fighters made up of French and Mi'kmaq. They killed 18 of the 20 British troops.

On May 30, the Mi'kmaq at Chapeau Rouge (L'Ardoise) attacked thirteen English soldiers from Captain Fletcher's crew on the Boston Packet, who were seeking wood and water. They killed seven English soldiers, three of whom were scalped. They also took three prisoners, two of whom were later found butchered and one later died of wounds.

On June 24, the Defence and the Boston Packet sent a plundering expedition on shore near "Laten".

Royal (Grand) Battery 

Upon landing, the British forces immediately launched an attack on the North East Harbour (present-day Louisbourg, Nova Scotia).  The act terrorized the French and they abandoned the Royal Battery with much of its armaments still operational.  The British immediately occupied the battery and began firing at the fortress.  They repulsed a French and Indian attempt to re-take the battery the following day.

Island Battery 

The Island Battery was the most formidable and took the New Englanders six weeks to silence. The Island Battery, which had 160 troops, needed to be defeated before the Royal Navy could enter the harbour.

On May 26, the 100 British troops under the command of Samuel Waldo turned the canons of the Royal Battery on the Island Battery and bombarded the battery for days.

On June 6, Captain Brooks led 400 British troops against the Island Battery and were repulsed by the French troops. The French killed 60 British troops and took 116 prisoner.

5th failed attack
Later on June 7, Gorham commanded 650 troops to attack but was forced to retreat. The French killed 189 New Englanders in the failed assault.

On June 9, the 100 British troops fight 100 French and 80 Indigenous. The British killed 40 and took seventeen prisoners. The French and Indigenous killed 6 British and wounded many more.

Careening Wharf Battle
Gorham and 40 rangers discovered 30 French canon at the Careening Wharf on June 9. The next day, the French Governor Du Chambon sent 100 inexperienced French troops under the command of Sieur de Beaubassin. Gorham and his rangers were able to launch a surprise attack on the French troops, killing five of them. One of Gorham's (Indian) rangers was killed. (By June 11 (new style), Beaubassin's force was decimated with many Mi’kmaw fighters killed.)

Gorham’s Battery 

By June 21, Gorham had built a battery at Lighthouse Point. He had hauled ten cannon from the Royal Battery. He shelled the Island Battery for five days and on June 27 the French Battery was silenced.

Surrender 
On June 27, French and native reinforcements led by Paul Marin were prevented from reaching Louisbourg in the Naval battle off Tatamagouche. The New Englanders' landward siege was supported by Commodore Warren's fleet and, following 47 days (six weeks and five days) of siege and bombardment, the French capitulated on June 28, 1745.

Aftermath

News of the victory reached Governor Shirley in Boston on July 3 which, coincidentally, was commencement day at Harvard (usually a day of celebration in itself). All of New England celebrated the taking of France's mighty fortress on the Atlantic.

Losses to the New England forces in battle had been modest, although the garrison that occupied the fortress during the following winter suffered many deaths from cold and disease. After the fall of Louisbourg, the New Englanders also assumed control of Port-La-Joye on present-day Prince Edward Island (which the French regained in battle the following year).

Despite the British conquest of Louisbourg, the French and Wabanaki attacks continued on Northern New England in the campaigns of 1745, 1746, and 1747).

Duchambon's actions in the mutiny and siege were the subject of inquiries upon his return to France in August 1745. Duchambon was protected from reprisals by the actions of François Bigot, Louisbourg's civilian administrator, who deflected much of the blame onto others. Duchambon retired from the service with a pension in March 1746.

William Pepperrell and Peter Warren were both richly rewarded for their efforts. Warren, in addition to profiting from prize money, was promoted to rear admiral. Pepperrell was made a baronet by King George II and given a commission as colonel of a new regiment, numbered 66th at the time (but not to be confused with the later 66th Regiment of Foot). Governor Shirley was also given a colonel's commission to raise his own regiment.

Both France and Britain planned expeditions to North America in the wake of the capture. The great Duc d'Anville Expedition led by Admiral Jean-Batiste, De Roye de la Rochefoucauld, Duc d'Anville was dispatched from France to retake Louisbourg and recover Acadia in 1746.  However it was destroyed by storms, disease, and British naval attacks and never reached the fortress.  The British government made plans, based on suggestions by Shirley and Warren, for a follow-up expedition to seize Quebec. For a variety of reasons, including a late start and contrary winds, the 1746 expedition did not leave European waters, and was instead diverted to raid the French port of Lorient.  Although the idea was also considered for the 1747 campaign season, it again failed to bear fruit.

When the war ended with the signing of the Treaty of Aix-la-Chapelle in 1748, Louisbourg was returned to France in exchange for the return of Madras to Britain, and the withdrawal of French troops from the Low Countries. The decision to withdraw from Louisbourg came under fierce attacks in London from opponents of the Pelham Ministry, but it went ahead nonetheless. In 1758 the fortress was captured again by the British during the Seven Years' War, this time permanently, as Île-Royale and much of New France was ceded to Britain under the terms of the 1763 Treaty of Paris.

French naval officers 
 Chevalier Guy-François de Coëtnempren (Comte de Kersaint), (Renommee)

British army regiments: officers

Maine 
1. York County, Maine - William Pepperell's Regiment (1st Massachusetts Regiment)

 Colonel Bradstreet, Lieut Colonel Storer, Major Cutts, Captain Peter Staples, Captain Ephraim Baker, Captain John Fairfield, Captain Bray Dearing, Captain Kinslagh, Captain John Harmon, Captain Moses Butler, Captain Thomas Perkins, Captain William Warner, Captain Moses Pearson

2. York County, Maine - Colonel Jeremiah Moulton's Regiment (3rd Massachusetts Regiment)

 Lieut. Colonel Connell; Major Ellis; Captain John Card, Captain John Lane, Christopher Marshall, Captain James Grant, Captain Charles King, Captain Peter Prescott (killed), Captain Ami R. Cutter, Captain Samuel Rhodes, Captain Bartholomew Trow, Captain Estes Hatch

3. Cumberland County, Maine - Colonel Samuel Waldo's Regiment (2nd Massachusetts Regiment)

 Lieut. Colonel Noble, Major William Hunt, Captains Samuel Moody, John Watts, Philip Damarisque, Daniel Hale (wounded), Jacob Stevens, James Noble, Richard Jacques, Captain Daniel Fogg, Joseph Richardson (kept journal)
4. Bristol, Maine - Colonel Sylvester Richmond's Regiment (6th Massachusetts Regiment)
 Lieut. Colonel Pitts, Major Hodges, Captains Nathaniel Bosworth, Thomas Gilbert, Josiah Pratt, Robert Swan, Ebenezer Eastman, Cornelius Sole, John Lawrence, Nathaniel Williams, Ebenezer Nichols, Jeremiah Weston

New Hampshire 
5. New Hampshire – Colonel Samuel Moore (military officer)'s Regiment (of Portsmouth)

 Lieut. Colonel Nathaniel Meserve, Major Ezekiah Gilman; Captains Samuel Whitten, William Waldron, True Dudley, Tufton Mason, William Seaward, Daniel Ladd, Joseph Sherbrune (wrote journal), John Turnel, Samuel Hale, Jacob Tilton, Edward Williams
 Roll of New Hampshire Men at Louisburg, Cape Breton, 1745 By New Hampshire. Commissioner at Louisburg Celebration, 1895

Connecticut 
6. Connecticut – Major General Roger Wolcott's Regiment

 Wolcott of Windsor, Connecticut; Col Andrew Burr; Lieut Col. Simon Lothrop; Major Goodridge; Major Israel Newton (killed); Captain David Wooster, Captain Stephen Lee, Captain Daniel Chapman, Captain William Whiting, Captain Robert Dennison, Captain Andrew Ward; Captain James Church, Captain Henry King

Massachusetts 
7. Worcester, Massachusetts - Colonel Samuel Willard (military officer)'s Regiment (4th Massachusetts Regiment)
 Lieut. Col. Chandler, Major Seth Pomroy, Captains Joshua Pierce (killed), John /Terry, John Alexander, David Melvin, John Warner, Jabez (Omsteads) Homestead, Joseph Miller (wounded), James Goulding, James Stephens

8. Essex County, Massachusetts - Colonel Robert Hale (military officer)'s Regiment (5th Massachusetts Regiment)

 Lieut. Colonel Edward Eveleigh, Major Moses Titcomb, Captains Benjamin Ives, Daniel Eveleigh, Titcomb, John Dodge, Jonathan Bagley, Jeremiah Foster, Samuel Davis, Thomas Stanford, Charles Byles

9. Brigadier Joseph Dwight's Regiment - Colonel of Artillery, (9th Massachusetts Regiment)
 Lieut. Col Thomas, Major Samuel Gardner

10. Colonel Shubael Gorham's Regiment (7th Massachusetts Regiment)

 Major Joseph Thatcher, Captains Jonathan Carey, Elisha Doane, Sylvester Cobb, Israel Bailey, Edward Demmick/ Dimmock (killed), Gerhom Bradford, Samuel Lombard

British naval officers 

 Commodore Peter Warren
 Captain Richard Tiddleman (T. Somers) (Superbe, 415 men, 60 guns)
 Captain Philip Durell (Eltham, 250 men, 40 guns)
 Captain W. J? Calmady (Launceston, 250 men, 40 guns)
 Captain James Douglas (then Capt. W. Montague) (Mermaid, 250 men, 40 guns)

Joined from England 22–23 May
 Captain Frederick Cornwall (Hector, 40 guns)
 Captain Richard Edwards (Princess Mary, 60 guns)

Joined from England 10–11 June
 Captain John Hore/ Hoar (D. Hare) (Canterbury, 60 guns);
 Captain J. Brett (Sunderland, 60 guns);
 Captain J. Crickshanke (Lark, 40 guns);
 Capt. F. Geary  (Capt. Kemp) (Chester, 50 guns)
 Capt. James Douglas (Vigilant, 64 guns) – Former prize taken 18 May
 Captain Clark Gayton (Bien Aime, 30 guns) – former prize
 Captain Britt (Sunderland, 60 guns)

Massachusetts naval forces 
 Captain Edward Tyng (Ship Massachusetts frigate, 150 men, 20 guns)
 Captain Jonathan Snelling (Molineux frigate, 150 men, 20 guns)
 Captain George Griffith (Caesar, 70 men, 14 guns)
 Captain John Rouse (Shirley Galley, 150 men, 20 guns)
 Captain Joseph Smithers/ Smythurst (Snow Prince of Orange (ship), 80 men, 14 guns – sank in storm)
 Captain William Fletcher (Brig Boston Packet, 16 guns; Wattering)
 Captain David Donahew  (Sloop, 12 guns)
 Captain Thomas Saunders (sloop, 8 guns)
 Captain Bosch (sloop, 8 guns)

Other naval forces 
 Captain Griffin (Rhode Island sloop, 20 guns)
 Captain Thompson (Connecticut vessel, 16 guns)
 Captain John Prentice (Defence, Connecticut vessel, 12 guns, 100 men)
 Captain John Furnell (Fernald), (Abigail, 14 or 10 guns) – New Hampshire sloop
 Captain Daniel Fones (Tartar (ship), 14 guns) – Rhode Island sloop

Other British military personnel 

 Richard Jacques , 2nd Massachusetts Regiment (Maine)
 James Gibson
 Samuel Whittemore, 3rd Massachusetts Regiment
 John Gorham
 John Henry Bastide
 Hector Theophilus de Cramahé
 Robert Denison, Connecticut Regiment
 Sir Charles Douglas, 1st Baronet
 Bartholomew Green
 Richard Gridley (engineer of the batteries)
 Robert Hale, 1st Massachusetts Regiment (Maine)
 Abijah Willard, 4th Massachusetts Regiment
 Robert Prescott
 Samuel Moody
 James Monk, 1st Massachusetts Regiment (Maine)
 Beamsley Perkins Glasier, 5th Massachusetts Regiment
 John Caleff
 William Vaughan
 Christopher Aldridge
 Nathan Whiting
 James Frye

Legacy 
 Louisburg Square in Boston is named after the siege.
 Vernon Street, Halifax, Nova Scotia was formerly known as Louisbourg Street.
 Shirley Street, Halifax, Nova Scotia is named for Massachusetts Governor William Shirley.
 Pepperell St. Halifax, Nova Scotia was named after Pepperrell
 Pepperell, Massachusetts was named after William Pepperrell.
 Warren, Rhode Island and Warren, New Hampshire are named after British naval hero Admiral Sir Peter Warren.

See also 
 Swiss regiment de Karrer
 Military history of Nova Scotia
 Louisbourg Garrison
 Provincial troops in the French and Indian Wars

Notes

References

Bibliography

Primary sources
  Also: 
 
 
 
 
  Also:  
  Also: 
  Also: 
 
 
 
 
 
 
  Also: 
 
 
 
 
  Also: 
  Also:  Only account from the French viewpoint except the official reports

Secondary sources
 Drake. The Taking of Louisbourg, 1745. 1891.
 
 
 Balcom, B.A. "Defending Unama'ki: Mi'kmaw Resistance in Cape Breton, 1745"
 Balcom. A.A. "The Mi'kmaq and the First Siege of Louisbourg, 1745," Paper presented at the 2003 Spring Heritage Conference, Amherst, Nova Scotia
  Also 
 
 
 
 
  Also: 
 
  Also: 
 
 
  Also: 
 
 
  Also:

External links

 Freemasons at the Two Sieges of Louisbourg
 List of Soldiers, 1745, Collections of the Connecticut Historical Society 13: 76–80
 Louisburg Soldiers (1745)
 Siege of Louisbourg (1745) – Parks Canada
 The Daily Journals, Diaries, Letters, and Accounts of Louisbourg and Isle Royale (1713–1768)
 Louisbourg Under Siege, a National Film Board of Canada documentary
 , details of the French surrender at Louisbourg

1745 in Canada
1745 in New France
Louisbourg 1745
Louisbourg
Military history of Acadia
Military history of New England
Military history of Nova Scotia
Military history of the Thirteen Colonies
New France
Pre-statehood history of Massachusetts
Louisbourg 1745
Louisbourg 1745
Louisbourg
Louisbourg